The commune of Nyamurenza is a commune of Ngozi Province in northern Burundi. The capital lies at Nyamurenza.

References

Communes of Burundi
Ngozi Province